The Supreme Revolutionary Council was the body that ruled Madagascar from 1975 to 1991. Didier Ratsiraka became the President of the Supreme Revolutionary Council on 15 June 1975, and was later sworn in as President of Madagascar on 4 January 1976

Members (March 1985) 
 Didier Ratsiraka
 Col. Désiré Rakotoarijaona
 Richard Andriamanjato
 Dr. Jérôme Marojama Razanabahiny
 Solo Norbert Andriamorasata
 Justin Rakotoniaina
 Manandafy Rakotonirina
 Col. Jean Ferlin Fiakara
 Lt-Col. Ferdinand Jaotombo
 Lt-Col. Max Valérien Marson
 Etienne Mora
 Jean-Baptiste Ramanantsalama
 Lt-Col. Jean de Dieu Randriantanany
 Arsène Ratsifehera
 M. Rakotovao-Razakaboana
 Celestin Radio
 Simon Pierre
 George Thomas Indrianjafy
 Maharanga Tsihozony
 Michel Mahatsanga
 Théophile Andrianoelisoa
 André Sosohany
 Victor Henri Boanoro

References 
 The Europa World Year Book 1985, Volume II, p. 2093

Politics of Madagascar
Political organisations based in Madagascar